Hymenopellis is a genus of fungi in the family Physalacriaceae. The genus was described by mycologist Ron Petersen in 2010. The type species is Hymenopellis radicata, originally described by British botanist Richard Relhan in 1780 as Agaricus radicatus.

Species

References

External links

Physalacriaceae
Taxa named by Ron Petersen